Jeffrey Edward Epstein (January 20, 1953August 10, 2019) was an American sex offender and financier. Epstein, who was born and raised in Brooklyn, New York City, with his brother Mark began his professional life by teaching at the Dalton School in Manhattan, despite lacking a college degree. After his dismissal from the school, he entered the banking and finance sector, working at Bear Stearns in various roles; he eventually started his own firm. Epstein developed an elite social circle and procured many women and children whom he and his associates sexually abused.

In 2005, police in Palm Beach, Florida, began investigating Epstein after a parent reported that he had sexually abused her 14-year-old daughter. Epstein pleaded guilty and was convicted in 2008 by a Florida state court of procuring a child for prostitution and of soliciting a prostitute. He served almost 13months in custody, but with extensive work release. He was convicted of only these two crimes as part of a controversial plea deal; federal officials had identified 36girls, some as young as 14 years old, whom Epstein had allegedly sexually abused.

Epstein was arrested again on July 6, 2019, on federal charges for the sex trafficking of minors in Florida and New York. He died in his jail cell on August 10, 2019. The medical examiner ruled that his death was a suicide by hanging. Epstein's lawyers have disputed the ruling, and there has been significant public skepticism about the true cause of his death, resulting in numerous conspiracy theories. Since Epstein's death precluded the possibility of pursuing criminal charges against him, a judge dismissed all criminal charges on August 29, 2019. Epstein had a decades-long association with the British socialite Ghislaine Maxwell, leading to her 2021 conviction on U.S. federal charges of sex trafficking and conspiracy for helping him procure girls, including a 14-year-old, for child sexual abuse and prostitution.

Early life 

Epstein was born in 1953 in the Brooklyn borough of New York City. His parents Pauline (née Stolofsky, 1918–2004) and Seymour G. Epstein (1916–1991) were Jewish and had married in 1952 shortly before his birth. Pauline worked as a school aide and was a homemaker. Seymour Epstein worked for the New York City Department of Parks and Recreation as a groundskeeper and gardener. Jeffrey was the older of two siblings; he and his brother Mark grew up in the working-class neighborhood of Sea Gate, a private gated community in Coney Island, Brooklyn.

Epstein attended local public schools, first attending Public School 188, and then Mark Twain Junior High School nearby. In 1967, Epstein attended the National Music Camp at the Interlochen Center for the Arts. He began playing the piano when he was five. He graduated in 1969 from Lafayette High School at age 16, having skipped two grades. Later that year, he attended classes at Cooper Union until he changed colleges in 1971. From September 1971, he attended the Courant Institute of Mathematical Sciences at New York University, but left without receiving a degree in June 1974.

Career

Teaching 
Epstein started working in September 1974 as a physics and mathematics teacher for teens at the Dalton School on the Upper East Side of Manhattan. Donald Barr, who served as the headmaster until June 1974, was known to have made several unconventional recruitments at the time, although it is unclear whether he had a direct role in hiring Epstein. Three months after Barr's departure, Epstein began to teach at the school, despite his lack of credentials. Epstein allegedly showed inappropriate behavior toward underage students at the time. He became acquainted with Alan Greenberg, the chief executive officer of Bear Stearns, whose son and daughter were attending the school. Greenberg's daughter, Lynne Koeppel, pointed to a parent-teacher conference where Epstein influenced another Dalton parent into advocating for him to Greenberg. In June 1976, after Epstein was dismissed from Dalton for "poor performance", Greenberg offered him a job at Bear Stearns.

Banking 
Epstein joined Bear Stearns in 1976 as a low-level junior assistant to a floor trader. He swiftly moved up to become an options trader, working in the special products division, and then advised the bank's wealthiest clients, such as Seagram president Edgar Bronfman, on tax mitigation strategies. Jimmy Cayne, the bank's later chief executive officer, praised Epstein's skill with wealthy clients and complex products. In 1980, four years after joining Bear Stearns, Epstein became a limited partner.

In 1981, Epstein was asked to leave Bear Stearns for, according to his sworn testimony, being guilty of a "Reg D violation". Even though Epstein departed abruptly, he remained close to Cayne and Greenberg and was a client of Bear Stearns until its collapse in 2008.

Financial consulting

In August 1981, Epstein founded his own consulting firm, Intercontinental Assets Group Inc. (IAG), which assisted clients in recovering stolen money from fraudulent brokers and lawyers. Epstein described his work at this time as being a high-level bounty hunter. He told friends that he worked sometimes as a consultant for governments and the very wealthy to recover embezzled funds, while at other times he worked for clients who had embezzled funds. Spanish actress and heiress Ana Obregón was one such wealthy client, whom Epstein helped in 1982 to recover her father's millions in lost investments, which had disappeared when Drysdale Government Securities collapsed because of fraud.

Epstein also stated to some people at the time that he was an intelligence agent. During the 1980s, Epstein possessed an Austrian passport that had his photo, but with a false name. The passport showed his place of residence in Saudi Arabia. In 2017 "a former senior White House official" reported that Alexander Acosta, the U.S. Attorney for the Southern District of Florida who had handled Epstein's criminal case in 2008, had stated to Trump transition interviewers, that "I was told Epstein 'belonged to intelligence' and to 'leave it alone", and that Epstein was "above his pay grade".

During this period, one of Epstein's clients was the Saudi Arabian businessman Adnan Khashoggi, who was the middleman in transferring American weapons from Israel to Iran, as part of the Iran–Contra affair in the 1980s. Khashoggi was one of several defense contractors that he knew. In the mid-1980s, Epstein traveled multiple times between the United States, Europe, and Southwest Asia. While in London, Epstein met Steven Hoffenberg. They had been introduced through Douglas Leese, a defense contractor, and John Mitchell, the former U.S. Attorney General.

Towers Financial Corporation 
Steven Hoffenberg hired Epstein in 1987 as a consultant for Towers Financial Corporation (unaffiliated with the company of the same name founded in 1998, and acquired by Old National Bancorp in 2014), a collection agency that bought debts people owed to hospitals, banks, and phone companies.

Hoffenberg and Epstein then refashioned themselves as corporate raiders using Towers Financial as their raiding vessel. One of Epstein's first assignments for Hoffenberg was to implement what turned out to be an unsuccessful bid to take over Pan American World Airways in 1987. A similar unsuccessful bid in 1988 was made to take over Emery Air Freight Corp. During this period, Hoffenberg and Epstein worked closely together and traveled everywhere on Hoffenberg's private jet.

In court documents, Hoffenberg claimed that Epstein was intimately involved in the scheme. Epstein left the company by 1989 and was never charged for involvement in the massive investor fraud committed. It is unknown if Epstein acquired any stolen funds from the Towers Ponzi scheme.

Financial management firm 

In 1988, while Epstein was still consulting for Hoffenberg, he founded his financial management firm, J. Epstein & Company.

The only publicly known billionaire client of Epstein was Leslie Wexner, chairman and CEO of L Brands (formerly The Limited, Inc.) and Victoria's Secret. In 1986, Epstein met Wexner through their mutual acquaintances, insurance executive Robert Meister and his wife, in Palm Beach, Florida. A year later, Epstein became Wexner's financial adviser and served as his right-hand man. Within the year, Epstein had sorted out Wexner's entangled finances. In July 1991, Wexner granted Epstein full power of attorney over his affairs. The power of attorney allowed Epstein to hire people, sign checks, buy and sell properties, borrow money, and do anything else of a legally binding nature on Wexner's behalf.

By 1995, Epstein was a director of the Wexner Foundation and Wexner Heritage Foundation. He was also the president of Wexner's Property, which developed part of the town of New Albany outside Columbus, Ohio, where Wexner lived. Epstein made millions in fees by managing Wexner's financial affairs. Although never employed by L Brands, he frequently corresponded with the company executives. Epstein often attended Victoria's Secret fashion shows, and hosted the models at his New York City home, as well as helping aspiring models get work with the company.

In 1996, Epstein changed the name of his firm to the Financial Trust Company and, for tax advantages, based it on the island of St. Thomas in the U.S. Virgin Islands. By relocating to the U.S. Virgin Islands, Epstein was able to reduce federal income taxes by 90 percent. The U.S. Virgin Islands acted as an offshore tax haven, while at the same time offering the advantages of being part of the United States banking system.

Media activities 
In 2003, Epstein bid to acquire New York magazine. Other bidders included advertising executive Donny Deutsch, investor Nelson Peltz, media mogul and New York Daily News publisher Mortimer Zuckerman, and film producer Harvey Weinstein. The ultimate buyer was Bruce Wasserstein, a longtime Wall Street investment banker, who paid .

Epstein and Zuckerman were equal partners in the venture. Roshan, as its editor-in-chief, retained a small ownership stake. It folded after three issues as a print publication and became exclusively an online one.

Liquid Funding Ltd. 

Epstein was the president of the company Liquid Funding Ltd. between 2000 and 2007. The company was an early pioneer in expanding the kind of debt that could be accepted on repurchase, or the repo market, which involves a lender giving money to a borrower in exchange for securities that the borrower then agrees to buy back at an agreed-upon later time and price. The innovation of Liquid Funding, and other early companies, was that instead of having stocks and bonds as the underlying securities, it had commercial mortgages and investment-grade residential mortgages bundled into complex securities as the underlying security.

Liquid Funding was initially 40percent owned by Bear Stearns. Through the help of the credit rating agencies – Standard & Poor's, Fitch Ratings and Moody's Investors Service – the new bundled securities were able to be created for companies so that they got a gold-plated AAA rating. The implosion of such complex securities, because of their inaccurate ratings, led to the collapse of Bear Stearns in March 2008 and set in motion the financial crisis of 2007–2008 and the subsequent Great Recession. If Liquid Funding were left holding large amounts of such securities as collateral, it could have lost large amounts of money.

Investments

Hedge funds 
Between 2002 and 2005, Epstein invested $80million in the D.B. Zwirn Special Opportunities Fund, a hedge fund that invested in illiquid debt securities. In November 2006, Epstein attempted to redeem his investment after he was informed of accounting irregularities in the fund. By this time, his investment had grown to $140million. The D.B. Zwirn fund refused to redeem the investment. Hedge funds that invest in illiquid securities typically have years-long "lockups" on their capital for all investors and require redemption requests to be made in writing 60 to 90 days in advance. The fund was closed in 2008, and its remaining assets of approximately $2billion, including Epstein's investment, were transferred to Fortress Investment Group when that firm bought the assets in 2009. Epstein later went to arbitration with Fortress over his redemption attempt. The outcome of that arbitration is not publicly known.

In August 2006, Epstein, a month after the federal investigation of him began, invested $57million in the Bear Stearns High-Grade Structured Credit Strategies Enhanced Leverage hedge fund. This fund was highly leveraged in mortgage-backed collateralized debt obligations (CDOs).

On April 18, 2007, an investor in the fund, who had $57million invested, discussed redeeming his investment. At this time, the fund had a leverage ratio of 17:1, which meant for every dollar invested there were seventeen dollars of borrowed funds; therefore, the redemption of this investment would have been equivalent to removing $1billion from the thinly traded CDO market. The selling of CDO assets to meet the redemptions that month began a repricing process and general freeze in the CDO market. The repricing of the CDO assets caused the collapse of the fund three months later in July, and the eventual collapse of Bear Stearns in March 2008. It is likely Epstein lost most of this investment, but it is not known how much was his.

By the time that the Bear Stearns fund began to fail in May 2007, Epstein had begun to negotiate a plea deal with the U.S. Attorney's Office concerning imminent charges for sex with minors. In August 2007, a month after the fund collapsed, the U.S. attorney in Miami, Alexander Acosta, entered into direct discussions about the plea agreement. Acosta brokered a lenient deal, according to him, because he had been ordered by higher government officials, who told him that Epstein was an individual of importance to the government. As part of the negotiations, according to the Miami Herald, Epstein provided "unspecified information" to the Florida federal prosecutors for a more lenient sentence and was supposedly an unnamed key witness for the New York federal prosecutors in their unsuccessful June 2008 criminal case against the two managers of the failed Bear Stearns hedge fund. Alan Dershowitz, one of Epstein's Florida attorneys on the case, told Fox Business Network "We would have been touting that if he had [cooperated]. The idea that Epstein helped in any prosecution is news to me."

Israeli startup
In 2015, the Israeli newspaper Haaretz reported that Epstein invested in the startup Reporty Homeland Security (rebranded as Carbyne in 2018). The startup was connected with Israel's defense industry. It was headed by former Israeli Prime Minister Ehud Barak, who was also at one time the defense minister, and chief of staff of the Israeli Defense Forces (IDF). The CEO of the company is Amir Elihai, a special forces officer, and Pinchas Bukhris, a director of the company and former defense ministry director general and commander of IDF cyber unit 8200. Epstein and Barak, the head of Carbyne, were close, and Epstein often offered him lodging at one of his apartment units at 301 East 66th Street in Manhattan. Epstein had past experience with Israel's research and military sector. In April 2008, he went to Israel and met with a number of research scientists and visited different Israeli military bases. During this trip, he thought about staying in Israel in order to avoid trial, and possible jail, for charges he was facing for sex crimes; however, he opted to return to the United States.

Video recordings 
Epstein installed concealed cameras in numerous places on his properties to allegedly record sexual activity with underage girls by prominent people for criminal purposes such as blackmail. Ghislaine Maxwell, Epstein's long-term girlfriend and companion, told a friend that Epstein's private island in the Virgin Islands was completely wired for video and the friend believed that Maxwell and Epstein were videotaping everyone on the island as an insurance policy. When police raided his Palm Beach residence in 2006, two hidden pinhole cameras were discovered in his home. It was also reported that Epstein's mansion in New York was wired extensively with a video surveillance system.

Maria Farmer, an artist who worked for Epstein in 1996, noted that Epstein showed her a media room in the New York mansion where there were individuals monitoring the pinhole cameras throughout the house. The media room was accessed through a hidden door. She stated that in the media room "there were men sitting here. And I looked on the cameras, and I saw toilet, toilet, bed, bed, toilet, bed." She added that "It was very obvious that they were, like, monitoring private moments."

Epstein allegedly "lent" girls to powerful people to ingratiate himself with them and also to gain possible blackmail information. According to the Department of Justice, he kept compact discs locked in his safe in his New York mansion with handwritten labels that included the description: "young [name] + [name]". Epstein implied that he had blackmail material when he told a New York Times reporter in 2018, off the record, that he had dirt on powerful people, including information about their sexual proclivities and recreational drug use.

Legal proceedings

First criminal case

Initial developments (2005–2006) 

In March 2005, a woman contacted Florida's Palm Beach Police Department and alleged that her 14-year-old stepdaughter had been taken to Epstein's mansion by an older girl. While there, she was allegedly paid $300 to strip and massage Epstein. She had allegedly undressed, but left the encounter wearing her underwear.

Palm Beach Police began a 13-month undercover investigation of Epstein, including a search of his home. During the investigation, Palm Beach Police Chief Michael Reiter publicly accused the Palm Beach County state prosecutor, Barry Krischer, of being too lenient and called for help from the FBI.

The Federal Bureau of Investigation (FBI) then became involved. Subsequently, the police alleged that Epstein had paid several girls to perform sexual acts with him. Interviews with five alleged victims and 17 witnesses under oath, a high-school transcript and other items found in Epstein's trash and home allegedly showed that some of the girls involved were under 18, the youngest being 14, with many under 16. The police search of Epstein's home found two hidden cameras and large numbers of photos of girls throughout the house, some of whom the police had interviewed in the course of their investigation. Adriana Ross, a former model from Poland who became an Epstein assistant, reportedly removed computer drives and other electronic equipment from the financier's Florida mansion before Palm Beach Police searched the home as part of their investigation. The court documents record that a search of Epstein's residence by Palm Beach Police detective Joseph Recarey in 2005 uncovered an incriminating Amazon receipt containing books on S&M. The books he ordered are titled: SM 101: A Realistic Introduction, SlaveCraft: Roadmaps for Erotic Servitude – Principles, Skills and Tools and Training with Miss Abernathy: A Workbook for Erotic Slaves and Their Owners.

A former employee told the police that Epstein would receive massages three times a day. Eventually the FBI compiled reports on "34 confirmed minors" eligible for restitution (increased to 40 in the non-prosecution agreement) whose allegations of sexual abuse by Epstein included corroborating details. Julie Brown's 2018 exposés in the Miami Herald identified about 80 victims and located about 60 of them. She quotes the then police chief Reiter as saying "This was 50-something 'shes' and one 'he'—and the 'shes' all basically told the same story." Details from the investigation included allegations that 12-year-old triplets were flown in from France for Epstein's birthday, and flown back the following day after being sexually abused by the financier. It was alleged that young girls were recruited from Brazil and other South American countries, former Soviet countries, and Europe, and that Jean-Luc Brunel's "MC2" modeling agency was also supplying girls to Epstein.

In May 2006, Palm Beach police filed a probable cause affidavit saying that Epstein should be charged with four counts of unlawful sex with minors and one count of sexual abuse. On July 27, 2006, Epstein was arrested by the Palm Beach Police Department on state felony charges of procuring a minor for prostitution and solicitation of a prostitute. He was booked at the Palm Beach County jail and later released on a $3,000 bond. State prosecutor Krischer later convened a Palm Beach County grand jury, which was usually only done in capital cases. Presented evidence from only two victims, the grand jury returned a single charge of felony solicitation of prostitution, to which Epstein pleaded not guilty in August 2006.

Epstein's defense lawyers included Roy Black, Gerald Lefcourt, Harvard Law School professor Alan Dershowitz, and former U.S. Solicitor General Ken Starr. Linguist Steven Pinker also assisted.

Non-prosecution agreement (NPA) (2006–2008)

In July 2006, the FBI began its own investigation of Epstein, nicknamed "Operation Leap Year". It resulted in a 53-page indictment in June 2007. Alexander Acosta, then the U.S. Attorney for the Southern District of Florida, agreed to a plea deal, which Alan Dershowitz helped to negotiate, to grant immunity from all federal criminal charges to Epstein, along with four named co-conspirators and any unnamed "potential co-conspirators". According to the Miami Herald, the non-prosecution agreement "essentially shut down an ongoing FBI probe into whether there were more victims and other powerful people who took part in Epstein's sex crimes". At the time, this halted the investigation and sealed the indictment. The Miami Herald said: "Acosta agreed, despite a federal law to the contrary, that the deal would be kept from the victims."

Acosta later said he offered a lenient plea deal because he was told that Epstein "belonged to intelligence", was "above his pay grade" and to "leave it alone". Epstein agreed to plead guilty in Florida state court to two felony prostitution charges, serve 18 months in prison, register as a sex offender, and pay restitution to three dozen victims identified by the FBI. The plea deal was later described as a "sweetheart deal".

A federal judge later found that the prosecutors had violated victims' rights by concealing the agreement from the victims and instead urging them to have "patience".

According to an internal review conducted by the Department of Justice's Office of Professional Responsibility, released in November 2020, Acosta showed "poor judgment" in granting Epstein a non-prosecution agreement and failing to notify Epstein's alleged victims about the agreement.

Conviction and sentencing (2008–2011) 
On June 30, 2008, after Epstein pleaded guilty to a state charge (one of two) of procuring for prostitution a girl below age 18, he was sentenced to 18months in prison. While most convicted sex offenders in Florida are sent to state prison, Epstein was instead housed in a private wing of the Palm Beach County Stockade and, according to the sheriff's office, was, after months, allowed to leave the jail on "work release" for up to 12hours a day, 6days a week. This contravened the sheriff's own policies requiring a maximum remaining sentence of 10months and making sex offenders ineligible for the privilege. He was allowed to come and go outside of specified release hours.

Epstein's cell door was left unlocked, and he had access to the attorney room where a television was installed for him, before he was moved to the Stockade's previously unstaffed infirmary. He worked at the office of a foundation he had created shortly before reporting to jail; he dissolved it after he had served his time. The Sheriff's Office received $128,000 from Epstein's non-profit to pay for the costs of extra services being provided during his work release. His office was monitored by "permit deputies" whose overtime was paid by Epstein. They were required to wear suits, and checked in "welcomed guests" at the "front desk". Later the Sheriff's Office said these guest logs were destroyed per the department's "records retention" rules (although inexplicably, the Stockade visitor logs were not). Epstein was allowed to use his own driver to drive him between jail and his office and other appointments.

Epstein served almost 13months before being released on July 22, 2009, for a year of probation on house arrest until August 2010. While on probation, he was allowed numerous trips on his corporate jet to his residences in Manhattan and the U.S. Virgin Islands. He was allowed long shopping trips and walks around Palm Beach "for exercise".

After a contested hearing in January 2011, and an appeal, he stayed registered in New York State as a "level three" (high risk of repeat offense) sex offender, a lifelong designation.
At that hearing, the Manhattan District Attorney argued unsuccessfully that the level should be reduced to a low-risk "level one" and was chided by the judge. Despite opposition from Epstein's lawyer that he had a "main" home in the U.S. Virgin Islands, the judge confirmed he personally must check in with the New York Police Department every 90days. Though Epstein had been a level-three registered sex offender in New York since 2010, the New York Police Department never enforced the 90-day regulation, though non-compliance is a felony.

Reactions 
The immunity agreement and Epstein's lenient treatment were the subject of ongoing public dispute. The Palm Beach police chief accused the state of giving him preferential treatment, and the Miami Herald said U.S. Attorney Acosta gave Epstein "the deal of a lifetime". Following Epstein's arrest in July 2019, on sex trafficking charges, Acosta resigned as Secretary of Labor effective July 19, 2019.

After the accusations against Epstein became public, several persons and institutions returned donations that they had received from him, including Eliot Spitzer, Bill Richardson, and the Palm Beach Police Department. Harvard University announced it would not return any money. Various charitable donations that Epstein had made to finance children's education were also questioned.

On June 18, 2010, Epstein's former house manager, Alfredo Rodriguez, was sentenced to 18months' incarceration after being convicted on an obstruction charge for failing to turn over to police, and subsequently trying to sell, a journal in which he had recorded Epstein's activities. FBI Special Agent Christina Pryor reviewed the material and agreed it was information "that would have been extremely useful in investigating and prosecuting the case, including names and contact information of material witnesses and additional victims."

Civil cases

Jane Does v. Epstein (2008) 

On February 6, 2008, an anonymous Virginia woman, known as Jane Doe No. 2, filed a $50-million civil lawsuit in federal court against Epstein, saying that when she was a 16-year-old minor in 2004–05, she was "recruited to give Epstein a massage". She claims she was taken to his mansion, where he exposed himself and had sexual intercourse with her, and paid her $200 immediately afterward.

A similar $50-million suit was filed in March 2008 by a different woman, who was represented by the same lawyer. These and several similar lawsuits were dismissed.

All other lawsuits had been settled by Epstein out of court; Epstein made many out-of-court settlements with alleged victims.

Victims' rights: Jane Does v. United States (2014) 

A December 30, 2014, federal civil suit was filed in Florida by Jane Doe 1 (Courtney Wild) and Jane Doe 2 against the United States for violations of the Crime Victims' Rights Act by the U.S. Department of Justice's NPA with Epstein and his limited 2008 state plea. There was a later, unsuccessful effort to add Virginia Roberts (Jane Doe 3) and another woman (Jane Doe 4) as plaintiffs to that case. The addition accused Alan Dershowitz of sexually abusing a minor, Jane Doe 3, provided by Epstein. The allegations against Dershowitz were stricken by the judge and eliminated from the case because he said they were outside the intent of the suit to re-open the plea agreement. A document filed in court alleges that Epstein ran a "sexual abuse ring", and lent underage girls to "prominent American politicians, powerful business executives, foreign presidents, a well-known prime minister, and other world leaders".

This long-running lawsuit is pending in federal court, aimed at vacating the federal plea agreement on the grounds that it violated victims' rights. On April 7, 2015, Judge Kenneth Marra ruled that the allegations made by alleged victim Virginia Roberts against Prince Andrew had no bearing on the lawsuit by alleged victims seeking to reopen Epstein's non-prosecution plea agreement with the federal government; the judge ordered that allegation to be struck from the record. Judge Marra made no ruling as to whether claims by Roberts are true or false. Though he did not allow Jane Does 3 and 4 to join the suit, Marra specifically said that Roberts may later give evidence when the case comes to court.

On February 21, 2019, in the case of Two Jane Does v. United States, Senior Judge of the U.S. District Court for the Southern District of Florida Kenneth Marra said federal prosecutors violated the law by failing to notify victims before they allowed him to plead guilty to only the two Florida offenses. The judge left open what the possible remedy could be.

Virginia Giuffre v. Epstein (2015) 

In a December 2014 Florida court filing by Bradley Edwards and Paul G. Cassell meant for inclusion in the Crime Victims Rights Act lawsuit, Virginia Giuffre (then known as Virginia Roberts), alleged in a sworn affidavit that at age 17, she had been sexually trafficked by Epstein and Ghislaine Maxwell for their own use and for use by several others, including Prince Andrew and retired Harvard Law professor Alan Dershowitz. Giuffre also claimed that Epstein, Maxwell and others had physically and sexually abused her. She alleged that the FBI may have been involved in a cover-up. She said she had served as Epstein's sex slave from 1999 to 2002, and had recruited other underage girls. Prince Andrew, Epstein, and Dershowitz all denied having had sex with Giuffre. Dershowitz took legal action over the allegations. Giuffre filed a defamation suit against Dershowitz, claiming he purposefully made "false and malicious defamatory statements" about her. A diary purported to belong to Giuffre was published online. Epstein entered an out-of-court settlement with Giuffre, as he had done in several other lawsuits.

In 2019, Giuffre was interviewed by the BBC's Panorama where she continued to attest that Epstein had trafficked her to Prince Andrew. She appealed directly to the public by stating "I implore the people in the UK to stand up beside me, to help me fight this fight, to not accept this as being ok." , these accusations had not been tested in any court of law.

Virginia Giuffre v. Ghislaine Maxwell (2015)
As a result of Giuffre's allegations and Maxwell's comments about them, Giuffre sued Maxwell for defamation in September 2015. After much legal confrontation, the case was settled under seal in May 2017. The Miami Herald, other media, and Alan Dershowitz filed to have the documents about the settlement unsealed. After the judge dismissed their request, the matter was appealed to the U.S. Court of Appeals for the Second Circuit.

On March 11, 2019, in the appeal of the district judge's refusal to unseal the documents relating to the 2017 defamation settlement of Giuffre v. Maxwell, the Second Circuit Court gave parties one week to provide good cause as to why they should remain under seal, without which they would be unsealed on March 19, 2019. Later the Court ordered these documents to be unsealed (after having them redacted to protect innocent parties). In Giuffre's testimony, she claims that she was "directed" by Maxwell to give erotic massages and engage in sexual activities with Prince Andrew; Jean-Luc Brunel; Glenn Dubin; Marvin Minsky; Governor Bill Richardson; another unnamed prince; an unnamed foreign president; "a well known Prime Minister"; and an unnamed hotel chain owner from France, among others. Giuffre testified, "my whole life revolved around just pleasing these men and keeping Ghislaine and Jeffrey happy. Their whole entire lives revolved around sex."

On August 9, less than 24 hours before Epstein's death, 2,000 pages of previously sealed documents from the case were released. Two sets of additional sealed documents will be analyzed by a federal judge to determine whether they should also be made public. A "John Doe" asked the judge on September 3 to permanently keep the documents secret, claiming "unproven allegations of impropriety" could damage his reputation, though he had no evidence his name was included.

Jane Doe v. Epstein and Trump (2016) 

A federal lawsuit filed in California in April 2016, against Epstein and Donald Trump by a California woman alleged that the two men sexually assaulted her at a series of parties at Epstein's Manhattan residence in 1994, when she was 13years old. The suit was dismissed by a federal judge in May 2016 because it did not raise valid claims under federal law. The woman filed another federal suit in New York in June 2016, but it was withdrawn three months later, apparently without being served on the defendants. A third federal suit was filed in New York in September 2016. 

The two latter suits included affidavits by an anonymous witness who attested to the accusations in the suits, asserting Epstein employed her to procure underage girls for him, and an anonymous person who declared the plaintiff had told him/her about the assaults at the time they occurred. The plaintiff, who had filed anonymously as Jane Doe, was scheduled to appear in a Los Angeles press conference six days before the 2016 election, but abruptly canceled the event; her lawyer Lisa Bloom asserted that the woman had received threats. The suit was dropped on November 4, 2016. Trump attorney Alan Garten denied the allegations, while Epstein declined to comment.

Sarah Ransome v. Epstein and Maxwell (2017) 

In 2017, Sarah Ransome filed a suit against Epstein and Maxwell, alleging that Maxwell had hired her to give massages to Epstein and later threatened to physically harm her or destroy her career prospects if she did not comply with their sexual demands at his mansion in New York City and on his private Caribbean island, Little Saint James. The suit was settled in 2018 under undisclosed terms.

Bradley Edwards' defamation v. Epstein (2018) 
A state civil lawsuit in Florida filed by attorney Bradley Edwards against Epstein was scheduled for trial in December 2018. The trial was expected to provide victims with their first opportunity to make their accusations in public. However, the case was settled on the first day of the trial, with Epstein publicly apologizing to Edwards; other terms of the settlement were confidential.

Maria Farmer v. Epstein and Maxwell (2019) 
On April 16, 2019, Maria Farmer went public and filed a sworn affidavit in federal court in New York, alleging that she and her 15-year-old sister, Annie, had been sexually assaulted by Epstein and Maxwell in separate locations in 1996. Farmer met Epstein and Maxwell at her graduate art gallery reception at the New York Academy of Art in 1995. The following year, in the summer of 1996, they hired her to work on an art project in Leslie Wexner's Ohio mansion, where she was then sexually assaulted. Farmer reported the incident to the New York City Police Department and the FBI.

Farmer's affidavit also stated that during the same summer, Epstein flew her then-15-year-old sister to his New Mexico property where he and Maxwell sexually abused her on a massage table.

Jennifer Araoz v. Epstein and Maxwell (2019) 
On July 22, 2019, while in jail awaiting trial, Epstein was served with a petition regarding a pending state civil lawsuit filed by Jennifer Araoz. She stated that an associate for Epstein had recruited her outside Talent Unlimited High School at age 14 and she was gradually groomed for over a year before Epstein raped her in his New York City mansion when she was 15. Araoz filed her suit on August 14, 2019, when New York State law was updated to allow one year for adult survivors of child sexual abuse to sue for previous offenses, regardless of how long ago the abuse took place. In October 2019, Araoz amended her complaint to include over 20 corporate entities associated with Epstein and named the additional individuals Lesley Groff and Cimberly Espinosa as enablers.

Katlyn Doe, et al. v. Epstein's estate (2019)
Three women (Katlyn Doe, Lisa Doe and Priscilla Doe) sued the estate of Jeffrey Epstein on August 20, 2019. Two of the women were 17 and one was 20 when they met Epstein. The women allege they were recruited, subjected to unwanted sex acts, and controlled by Epstein and a "vast enterprise" of co-conspirators.

Jane Doe v. Epstein's estate (2019) 
A New York accuser of Epstein, known only as Jane Doe, announced a federal lawsuit against his estate in the Southern District of New York on September 18, 2019, stating that she was recruited in 2002 and sexually abused by Epstein for three years starting at age 14.

Teresa Helm, et al. v. Epstein's estate (2019) 
Five women (Teresa Helm, Annie Farmer, Maria Farmer, Juliette Bryant, and an unidentified woman), represented by David Boies, sued Epstein's estate in Federal District Court in Manhattan in November 2019, accusing him of rape, battery and false imprisonment and seeking unspecified damages.

Jane Doe 15 v. Epstein's estate (2019) 
On November 18, 2019, a woman identified as Jane Doe 15 made a public appearance with her attorney Gloria Allred to announce that she was suing the estate of Jeffrey Epstein in the District Court for the Southern District of New York, alleging that he manipulated, trafficked, and sexually abused her in 2004, when she was 15 years old.

Teala Davies v. Epstein's estate (2019) 
On November 21, 2019, Teala Davies appeared with her attorney Gloria Allred and announced her lawsuit in Manhattan federal court against Epstein's estate. Davies stated that after meeting Epstein in 2002, he sexually assaulted and trafficked her in New York, New Mexico, Florida, the Virgin Islands and France.

Jane Does 1-9 v. Epstein's estate (2019) 
On December 3, 2019, lawyer Jordan Merson filed a lawsuit in New York on behalf of nine anonymous accusers (Jane Does 1–9) and against Epstein's estate for battery, assault, and intentional emotional distress. The claims date from 1985 through the 2000s, and include individuals who were 13, 14, and 15 when they first encountered Epstein.

JJ Doe v. Epstein's estate (2019) 
The lawsuit was filed by Bradley Edwards on behalf of his client in late December 2019. The accuser, JJ Doe, is described as being a 14-year-old resident of Palm Beach County at the time Epstein abused her in 2004.

US Virgin Islands v. Epstein's estate, et al. (2020) 
A lawsuit was filed in Superior Court of the U.S. Virgin Islands in January 2020 alleging that Epstein ran a sex trafficking conspiracy for over two decades, through 2018, with children as young as 11 years old on Epstein's Caribbean islands. According to Attorney General Denise George, his alleged criminal activities on the islands were concealed through a complex network of companies.

Jane Doe v. Maxwell and Epstein's estate (2020) 
In January 2020, a lawsuit was filed against Maxwell and Epstein alleging that they recruited a 13-year-old music student at the Interlochen Center for the Arts in 1994 and subjected her to sexual abuse The suit states that Jane Doe was repeatedly sexually assaulted by Epstein over a four-year period and that Maxwell played a key role in both her recruitment and by participating in the assaults.

Jane Does v. Epstein estate (2020) 
In August 2020 9 Jane Does filed suit accusing Epstein of sexual abuse. The alleged victims in the lawsuit include an 11 and 13 year old and a victim who alleged abuse in 1975.

Jane Doe v. Epstein estate (2020) 
In August 2020 Epstein was sued by a Jane Doe accusing him of sexually abusing her for over a year, beginning when she was an 18 years old.

Kelly Brennan v. Epstein estate (2021) 
A civil suit was filed against Epstein's estate in 2021 by Long Island native, Kelly Brennan, who accused Epstein of sexually assaulting her at a club restaurant in New York City called Cipriani. She accused Epstein of brutally raping and torturing her in his Manhattan residence in 2003.

Jane Doe v. Epstein estate (2021) 
A civil suit was filed against Epstein's estate in March 2021 by a Broward County woman who accused Epstein and Maxwell of trafficking her after repeatedly raping her in Florida in 2008.

Second criminal case

Sex trafficking charges

On July 6, 2019, Epstein was arrested by the FBI-NYPD Crimes Against Children Task Force at Teterboro Airport in New Jersey on sex trafficking charges. He was jailed at the Metropolitan Correctional Center in New York City.

According to witnesses and sources on the day of his arrest, about a dozen FBI agents forced open the door to his Manhattan townhouse, the Herbert N. Straus House, with search warrants. The search of his townhouse turned up evidence of sex trafficking and also found "hundreds – and perhaps thousands – of sexually suggestive photographs of fully – or partially – nude females". Some of the photos were confirmed as those of underage females. In a locked safe, compact discs were found with handwritten labels including the descriptions: "Young [Name] + [Name]", "Misc nudes 1", and "Girl pics nude". Also found in the safe were $70,000 in cash, 48 diamonds, and a fraudulent Austrian passport, which expired in 1987, that had Epstein's photo but another name. The passport had numerous entrance and exit stamps, including entrance stamps that showed the use of the passport to enter France, Spain, the United Kingdom, and Saudi Arabia in the 1980s. The passport showed his place of residence as Saudi Arabia. According to his attorneys, Epstein had been advised to acquire the passport because "as an affluent member of the Jewish faith", he was in danger of being kidnapped while traveling abroad.

On July 8, prosecutors with the Public Corruption Unit of the Southern District of New York charged him with sex trafficking and conspiracy to traffic minors for sex. The grand jury indictment alleges that "dozens" ofunderage girls were brought into Epstein's mansions for sexual encounters. Judge Kenneth Marra was to decide whether the non-prosecution agreement that protected Epstein from the more serious charges should still stand.

Epstein requested to be released on bond, offering to post $100million with the condition that he would also submit to house arrest in his New York City mansion. U.S. District Judge Richard M. Berman denied the request on July 18, saying that Epstein posed a danger to the public and a serious flight risk to avoid prosecution.

On August 29, 2019, following Epstein's death 20 days prior, the case against Epstein was closed after Judge Berman dismissed all sex trafficking charges. However, he also expressed support for Epstein's accusers. Prosecutors objected to the ruling and stated they would continue an investigation for potential co-conspirators.

Investigation in France 
On August 23, 2019, the prosecutor's office in Paris, France, opened a preliminary investigation into Epstein. He is being investigated for rape and sexual assault of minors under and over the age of 15, criminal association with a view to committing crimes, and association with criminals with a view to committing offenses. The prosecutors said that the goal of the investigation is to find possible crimes committed in France and elsewhere against French citizens.

Personal life
Previous long-term girlfriends associated with Epstein include Eva Andersson-Dubin and publishing heiress Ghislaine Maxwell. Epstein was romantically linked to Andersson-Dubin for an 11-year period mostly in the 1980s and the two later remained friendly well after her marriage to Glenn Dubin. Epstein met Maxwell, daughter of disgraced media baron Robert Maxwell, by 1991. Epstein had Maxwell come to the United States in 1991 to recover from her grief following the death of her father. Maxwell was implicated by several of Epstein's accusers as procuring or recruiting underage girls in addition to once being Epstein's girlfriend. In a 2009 deposition, several of Epstein's household employees testified that Maxwell had a central role in both his public and private life, referring to her as his "main girlfriend" who also handled the hiring, supervising, and firing of staff starting around 1992. In 1995, Epstein renamed one of his companies the Ghislaine Corporation in Palm Beach, Florida; the company was dissolved in 1998. In 2000, Maxwell moved into a 7,000-square-foot townhouse, less than 10blocks from Epstein's New York mansion. This townhome was purchased for $4.95million by an anonymous limited liability company, with an address that matches the office of J. Epstein & Co. Representing the buyer was Darren Indyke, Epstein's longtime lawyer. In a 2003 Vanity Fair exposé, Epstein refers to Maxwell as "my best friend".

Epstein was a longtime acquaintance of Prince Andrew and Tom Barrack, and attended parties with many prominent people, including Bill Clinton, George Stephanopoulos, Donald Trump, Katie Couric, Woody Allen, and Harvey Weinstein. His contacts included Rupert Murdoch, Michael Bloomberg, Richard Branson, Michael Jackson, Alec Baldwin and the Kennedys. His contacts also included Israeli prime minister Ehud Barak, British prime minister Tony Blair, and Saudi Arabian crown prince Mohammed bin Salman. Both Clinton and Trump claimed that they never visited Epstein's island.

Epstein was associated with former Trump chief Strategist Steve Bannon. According Michael Wolff, Bannon and Epstein were introduced in December 2017. Bannon met with Epstein several times at his mansion in New York. Also according to Wolff, Bannon coached Epstein for a 60 Minutes interview which never occurred. A New York Times article reported that Bill Gates's relationship with Jeffrey Epstein started in 2011, just a few years after Epstein's conviction, and continued for some years. In August 2021, Gates said the reason he had meetings with Epstein was because Gates hoped Epstein could provide money for philanthropic work, though nothing came of the idea. Gates added, "It was a huge mistake to spend time with him, to give him the credibility of being there."

Epstein owned a private Boeing 727 jet and traveled in it frequently, logging "600 flying hours a year ... usually with guests on board". The jet was nicknamed the Lolita Express by the locals in the Virgin Islands, because of its frequent arrivals at Little Saint James with apparently underage girls. In 2003, Epstein flew to Cuba aboard his plane with Colombian president Andrés Pastrana Arango at the invitation of Cuban president Fidel Castro. According to Fabiola Santiago of the Miami Herald, Epstein was likely considering relocating to Cuba in order to escape U.S. law enforcement; Epstein was under investigation from U.S. law enforcement at the time. In 2009, Epstein's brother Mark claimed Trump had flown on Epstein's plane at least once. He later told The Washington Post that Trump flew "numerous times" on Epstein's airplane, although Mark was present on only one of the flights. According to Michael Corcoran, Trump flew Epstein on his own airplane at least once. In September 2002, Epstein flew Clinton, Kevin Spacey, and Chris Tucker to Africa in this jet. Flight records obtained in 2016 show Bill Clinton flew 27times to at least a dozen international locations. Flight logs did not list any Secret Service detail for at least five flights, on an Asia trip, and Secret Service stated that there is no evidence of the former president making a trip to Epstein's private island. In 2019, a Clinton spokesperson stated that, in 2002 and 2003, Clinton took four trips on Epstein's airplane, making stops on three continents, all with his staff and Secret Service detail. At the time of Epstein's 2019 arrest, Clinton's spokeswoman Angel Ureña stated that Clinton had "not spoken to Epstein in well over a decade, and has never been to Little St. James Island, Epstein's ranch in New Mexico, or his residence in Florida."

In a profile of Epstein in New York magazine in 2002, former Democratic Senate leader George J. Mitchell said of Epstein, "I would certainly call him a friend and a supporter". In the same article, Donald Trump remarked, "I've known Jeff for fifteen years. Terrific guy. He's a lot of fun to be with. It is even said that he likes beautiful women as much as I do, and many of them are on the younger side. No doubt about it – Jeffrey enjoys his social life." In July 2019, Trump said "I knew him like everybody in Palm Beach knew him," stating four times he had not been "a fan" of Epstein and that he had not spoken to him in about fifteen years. A video shot in 1992 surfaced showing the two men partying together at Mar-a-Lago. By 2007, Trump reportedly banned Epstein from his Mar-a-Lago club for unseemly pursuit of young females. The ban allegation was included in court documents filed by attorney Bradley Edwards, although Edwards later said it was a rumor he tried to, but could not, confirm.

In 2002, a spokesman of Bill Clinton lauded Epstein as "a committed philanthropist" with "insights and generosity". At the time Epstein was on the board of Rockefeller University, a member of the Trilateral Commission and the Council on Foreign Relations, and was a major donor to Harvard University.

Epstein visited the White House while Clinton was president on four known occasions. In 1993, he went to a donor event at the White House with his companion Ghislaine Maxwell. Around the same time, he also met with President Clinton's aide Mark Middleton on at least three occasions at the White House. In 1995, financier Lynn Forester discussed "Jeffrey Epstein and currency stabilization" with Clinton. Epstein, according to his own accounts, was heavily involved in the foreign exchange market and traded large amounts of currency in the unregulated forex market. In 1995, Epstein also attended a small political fundraiser dinner for Bill Clinton which included 14 other people including Ron Perelman, Don Johnson, Jimmy Buffett, and dinner organizer Paul Prosperi.

From the 1990s to mid-2000s, Epstein often socialized with the future President Donald Trump. Author Michael Wolff wrote that Trump, Epstein, and Tom Barrack were at the time like a "set of nightlife musketeers" on the social scene. Epstein and Trump socialized both in New York City and Palm Beach, where they both had houses. In April 2003, New York magazine reported Epstein hosted a dinner party in his Manhattan residence to honor Bill Clinton, who did not attend, although Trump did attend. According to The Washington Post, one person who knew Epstein and Trump during this time noted that "they were tight" and "they were each other's wingmen". In November 2004, Epstein and Trump's friendship ran into trouble when they became embroiled in a bidding war for a $40million mansion, Maison de L'Amitie, which was being auctioned in Palm Beach. Trump won the auction for $41million, and successfully sold the property four years later for $95million to the Russian billionaire Dmitry Rybolovlev. That month was the last time Epstein and Trump were recorded to have interacted.

Wealth

The exact origin of Epstein's wealth is unknown. Leslie Wexner was one source of Epstein's original wealth. An assistant of Epstein also stated that he got his fortune started through Robert Maxwell, the media mogul father of Ghislaine Maxwell.

When Epstein pleaded guilty in 2008 to soliciting and procuring prostitution, his lawyers stated he was a billionaire with a net worth of over one billion dollars. A number of sources, however, have questioned the extent of Epstein's wealth and his status as a billionaire. According to an article in The New York Times, his "fortune may be more illusion than fact". Epstein lost "large sums of money" in the 2008 financial crisis, and "friends and patrons"—including retail billionaire Leslie Wexner, "deserted him" following his pleading guilty to prostitution charges in 2008. New York magazine claimed that "there's scant proof" of Epstein's "financial bona fides", and Forbes also ran an article entitled "Why sex offender Jeffrey Epstein is not a billionaire".

Spencer Kuvin, an attorney for three of Epstein's alleged victims in the case where Epstein pleaded guilty to sexual activity with minors, stated that "he and his team 'pursued every possible angle' to find out Epstein's net worth but found that much of his wealth is offshore." An investigation by the Miami Herald of the Swiss Leaks documents indicated that Epstein had multiple financial accounts with millions of dollars in offshore tax havens. In the Paradise Papers, records showed that Epstein in February 1997, became a client of Appleby, a Bermuda-based law firm which specialized in the creation of offshore companies and investment vehicles for the ultra-wealthy. A client profile of Epstein described his job cryptically as the "Manager of Fortune".

Federal prosecutors on July 12, 2019, stated in court documents that, based on records from one financial institution, Jeffrey Epstein was "extravagantly wealthy" and had assets worth at least $500million and earned more than $10million a year. The extent of his wealth, however, was not known, since he had not filled out a financial affidavit for his bail application. According to Bloomberg News, "Today, so little is known about Epstein's current business or clients that the only things that can be valued with any certainty are his properties." The Miami Herald in their investigation of the Paradise Papers and Swiss Leaks documents concluded that Epstein's wealth is likely spread secretly across the globe.

In 2020, Epstein estate's finances revealed that it had paid out nearly $50 million between June 2020 and December 2020 to more than 100 women who brought claims to the "Epstein Victims Compensation Fund" set up in the U.S. Virgin Islands. By February 2021, the estate was valued at about $240 million, down from estimates of $630 million a year earlier. This prompted the attorney general of the U.S. Virgin Islands, Denise George, to file an emergency motion seeking the immediate asset freeze. She contended in the court filing, which the victims joined, that the estate executors had "mismanaged" the money.

Residences 

Epstein owned the Herbert N. Straus House on 9 East 71st Street in the Upper East Side of Manhattan in New York City. It was originally purchased for $13.2million in 1989 by Epstein's mentor, Les Wexner, who renovated it completely. Epstein moved into the mansion in 1995 after Wexner married and moved with his wife to Columbus, Ohio, to raise their family. He took full possession of the mansion in 1998, when he paid Wexner $20million for it. The house was valued in 2019 by federal prosecutors at $77 million, while the city assessed its value at $56 million. Hidden under a flight of stairs, there is a lead-lined bathroom fitted with its own closed-circuit television screens and a telephone, both concealed in a cabinet under the sink. The house also has its own heated sidewalk to melt away the snow. The entrance hall is lined with rows of individually framed prosthetic eyeballs that were made in England for injured soldiers.

The financier's other properties include a residence in Palm Beach, Florida, purchased in 1990; seven units in an apartment building near the Arc de Triomphe at 22 Avenue Foch in Paris, France; a  ranch named Zorro Ranch near Stanley, New Mexico, purchased in 1993; a private island near Saint Thomas in the U.S. Virgin Islands called Little Saint James, which includes a mansion and guest houses, purchased in 1998; and the neighboring island of Great Saint James purchased in 2016. Epstein was building a compound on the latter including an amphitheater and "underwater office & pool" but ran into problems when a stop-work order was issued in late 2018; work continued despite the order.

Epstein, previous to his final Manhattan home, lived in a spacious townhouse, which was a former Iranian government building that had been taken over by the State Department during the Iranian revolution, at 34 East 69th Street for a rate of $15,000 a month from 1992 to 1995. He also previously owned a mansion outside Columbus, Ohio, near Wexner's home from 1992 to 1998 which he purchased from his mentor. Before the Herbert Straus house was purchased, Wexner purchased in 1988 the adjacent townhouse at 11 East 71st Street. Like in the case of the 9 East 71st Street house, Epstein was on the deed of the 11 East 71st Street house as the trustee. The townhouse was sold in 1996 to the Comet trust which holds part of the assets of the de Gunzburg/Bronfman family.

Epstein rented offices for his business dealings in the Villard House at 457 Madison Avenue. Steven Hoffenberg originally set up the offices for Epstein in 1987 when he was consulting for Tower Financial. Epstein used these offices until at least 2003. Around this time, Michael Wolff saw the financier in his office, which in the past were the offices of Random House. Wolff noted that Epstein's offices were a strange place which did not have a corporate feel at all. Wolff stated that the offices were "almost European. It's old—old-fashioned, unrehabbed in its way." Wolff continued that "the trading floor is filled with guys in yarmulkes. Who they are, I have no idea. They're like a throwback, a bunch of guys from the fifties. So here is Jeffrey in this incredibly beautiful office, with pieces of art and a view of the courtyard, and he seems like the most relaxed guy in the world. You want to say 'What's going on here?' and he gives you that Cheshire smile."

Epstein rented multiple apartment units for his employees, models, and guests since the 1990s at 301 East 66th Street. The majority of the apartment complex at this address is owned by Ossa properties, which is owned by Jeffrey Epstein's brother, Mark, who purchased the complex in the early 1990s from Wexner. Over the years Epstein has housed different friends at 11 East 71st Street, including his ex-girlfriend Eva Andersson, who is now married to his hedge-fund friend Glenn Dubin, MC2 Models founder Jean-Luc Brunel, and on occasions former Israeli Prime Minister Ehud Barak. He has housed some of his workers, including his pilot, housekeeper and office work staff, in the apartment complex. Epstein has also housed underage girls, who Brunel scouted for his MC2 modeling agency. On August 6, 2012, a model and party promoter associated with MC2, Pedro Gaspar, who lived above another of the modeling agency's locations in Manhattan, died of what some consider to be a suspicious drug overdose.

Political donations
From 1989 until 2003, Epstein donated more than $139,000 to U.S. Democratic Party federal candidates and committees and over $18,000 to U.S. Republican Party candidates and groups.

Epstein contributed $50,000 to Democrat Bill Richardson's successful campaign for Governor of New Mexico in 2002 and again for his successful run for reelection in 2006. Also that year, he contributed $15,000 to Democrat Gary King's successful campaign for Attorney General of New Mexico. He later contributed $35,000 to King's 2014 unsuccessful campaign for Governor. Other contributions in New Mexico included Epstein $10,000 toward Jim Baca's campaign to become head of the land commission and $2,000 toward Santa Fe County Sheriff Jim Solano's bid for reelection. In 2010, Epstein received a notice from New Mexico Department of Public Safety which said, "You are not required to register [as a sex offender] with the state of New Mexico." This was in contravention of federal law, which would seem to say that the conviction in Florida required him to register in New Mexico.

Philanthropy

In 1991, Epstein was one of four donors who pledged to raise  for a Hillel student building Rosovsky Hall at Harvard University. In 2000, Epstein established the Jeffrey Epstein VI Foundation, which funds science research and education. Prior to 2003, the foundation funded Martin Nowak's research at the Institute for Advanced Study in Princeton, New Jersey. In May 2003, Epstein pledged a series of donations totaling  to create a mathematical biology and evolutionary dynamics program at Harvard which was run by Martin Nowak. In 2019, Forbes deleted a 2013 article that called Epstein "one of the largest backers of cutting edge science" after The New York Times revealed its author, Drew Hendricks, had been paid $600 to submit it falsely as his own.

According to attorney Gerald B. Lefcourt, Epstein was "part of the original group that conceived of the Clinton Global Initiative".
Epstein co-organized a science event with illusionist and skeptic Al Seckel called the Mindshift Conference. The conference took place in 2010 on Epstein's private island Little Saint James. In attendance were scientists Murray Gell-Mann, Leonard Mlodinow, and Gerald Jay Sussman.

The true extent of Epstein's donations is unknown. The Jeffrey Epstein VI Foundation fails to disclose information which other charities routinely disclose. Concerns have been raised over this lack of transparency. In 2015, the Attorney General of the state of New York was reported to be trying to gain information but was refused since the charities were based outside of the state and did not solicit in New York State. Epstein, besides making donations through the Jeffrey Epstein VI Foundation, also made a number of charitable donations through his three private charities: Epstein Interest, the COUQ Foundation, and Gratitude American Ltd. According to federal tax filings, Epstein donated $30million between 1998 and 2018, through these three charities. Following his death, a number of scientists and institutions—including Harvard University and Massachusetts Institute of Technology (MIT)—came under criticism for accepting money from Epstein and his foundation, with some individuals offering to give away money donated by Epstein.

Interest in eugenics and transhumanism
According to various sources, beginning in the early 2000s Epstein developed a strong interest in "improving" the human race through genetic engineering and artificial intelligence, including using his own sperm. He addressed the scientific community at various events and occasions and communicated his fascination with eugenics. It was reported in August 2019 that Epstein had planned to "seed the human race with his DNA" by impregnating up to 20 women at a time using his New Mexico compound as a "baby ranch", where mothers would give birth to his offspring. He was an advocate of cryonics and his own idiosyncratic version of transhumanism, and had said that he intended to have his penis and head frozen.

Kathleen Hall Jamieson, director of the Annenberg Public Policy Center at the University of Pennsylvania said: "Scientists need funding for important work ... if the funding is for legitimate scientific work, there is nothing wrong with accepting support from a billionaire. However it would have been wrong for scientists to accept his funding if they were aware that he was planning a eugenics experiment that might draw legitimacy from his association with them." Professor George Church also publicly apologized for meeting Epstein after his 13-month sentence, saying "There should have been more conversations about, should we be doing this, should we be helping this guy? There was just a lot of nerd tunnel vision."

Death 

On July 23, 2019, Epstein was found injured and semiconscious at 1:30a.m. on the floor of his cell, with marks around his neck. His cellmate, former New York City police officer Nicholas Tartaglione, who was awaiting trial for four counts of murder, was questioned about Epstein's condition. He denied having any knowledge of what happened. Epstein said he believed that he was attacked by his cellmate, while the correctional staff suspected attempted suicide. According to NBC News, two sources said that Epstein might have tried to hang himself, a third said the injuries were not serious and could have been staged, and a fourth source said that an assault by his cellmate had not been ruled out. After that incident, he was placed on suicide watch. Six days later, on July 29, 2019, Epstein was taken off suicide watch and placed in a special housing unit with another inmate. Epstein's close associates said he was in "good spirits".

When Epstein was placed in the special housing unit, the jail informed the Justice Department that he would have a cellmate, and that a guard would look into the cell every 30 minutes. These procedures were not followed on the night of his death. On August 9, 2019, Epstein's cellmate was transferred out, but no one took his place. Later in the evening, contrary to the jail's normal procedure, Epstein was not checked every 30 minutes. The two guards who were assigned to check his jail unit that night fell asleep and did not check on him for about three hours; the guards falsified related records. Two cameras in front of Epstein's cell also malfunctioned that night.

Epstein was found dead in his cell at the Metropolitan Correctional Center (MCC) in New York City at 6:30a.m. EDT on August 10, 2019. The Bureau of Prisons said lifesaving measures were initiated immediately upon the discovery of Epstein's body. Emergency responders were called and he was taken to a hospital. On August 10, 2019, the Bureau of Prisons and U.S. Attorney General William Barr called the death an apparent suicide, although no final determination had been made. The circumstances leading up to his death are being investigated by the United States Department of Justice.

Autopsy 

On August 11, 2019, an autopsy was performed. It appeared likely that Epstein had thrown himself violently off the cell's top bunk, which would explain the damage he suffered, other than strangulation. The preliminary result of the autopsy found that Epstein sustained multiple breaks in his neck bones. Among the bones broken in Epstein's neck was the hyoid bone. Such breaks of the hyoid bone can occur from those who hang themselves, but they are more common in victims of homicide by strangulation. A 2010 study found broken hyoids in 25 percent of cases of hangings. A larger study conducted from 2010 to 2016 found hyoid damage in just 16 of 264, or six percent, of cases of hangings. Hyoid bone breaks become more common with age, as the bones become more brittle. Forensic pathologist Cyril Wecht noted that hanging by leaning forward would not result in broken cervical bones.

On August 16, 2019, Barbara Sampson, the New York City medical examiner, ruled Epstein's death a suicide by hanging. The medical examiner, according to Epstein's defense counsel, only saw nine minutes of footage from one security camera to help her arrive at her conclusion. Epstein's defense lawyers were not satisfied with the conclusion of the medical examiner and were conducting their own independent investigation into the cause of Epstein's death, including taking legal action, if necessary, to view the pivotal camera footage near his cell during the night of his death. Epstein's lawyers said that the evidence concerning Epstein's death was "far more consistent" with murder than suicide. Michael Baden, an independent pathologist hired by the Epstein estate, observed the autopsy. In October 2019, Dr. Baden said that Mr. Epstein, 66, experienced a number of injuries – among them a broken bone in his neck – that "are extremely unusual in suicidal hangings and could occur much more commonly in homicidal strangulation". Baden stated that he thinks that the evidence points to homicide rather than suicide.

Final will 
On August 18, 2019, it was reported that Jeffrey Epstein had signed his last will and testament on August 8, 2019, two weeks after being found injured in his cell and two days before his death. Until this time, Epstein had been depositing money in other inmates' commissary accounts to avoid being attacked. The signing of the will was witnessed by two attorneys that knew him. The will named two longtime employees as executors, and immediately gifted all of his assets, and any assets remaining in his estate, to a trust.

Burial
Following the autopsy, Epstein's body was claimed by his brother Mark. On September 5, 2019, Epstein's body was buried in an unmarked grave next to those of his parents at the I.J. Morris Star of David Cemetery in Palm Beach, Florida. The names of his parents were also removed from their tombstone in order to prevent vandalism.

Investigations 
Attorney General Barr ordered an investigation by the Department of Justice Inspector General in addition to the investigation by the Federal Bureau of Investigation, saying that he was "appalled" by Epstein's death in federal custody. Two days later Barr said there had been "serious irregularities" in the prison's handling of Epstein, promising "We will get to the bottom of what happened, and there will be accountability."

On August 14, 2019, Manhattan federal court Judge Richard M. Berman, who was overseeing Epstein's criminal case, wrote to the Metropolitan Correctional Center warden Lamine N'Diaye inquiring as to whether an investigation into the millionaire's apparent suicide would include a probe into his prior (July 23) injuries. Judge Berman wrote that to his knowledge it has never been definitely explained what they concluded about the incident.

The national president of the Council of Prison Locals C-33, E. O. Young, stated that prisons "can't ever stop anyone who is persistent on killing themselves". Between 2010 and 2016, around 124 inmates killed themselves while in federal custody, or around 20 prisoners per year, out of an inmate population of 180,000. The previous reported inmate suicide in the MCC facility in Manhattan was in 1998. The union leader Young said it was unclear if there was video of Epstein's hanging or direct observations by jail officials. He said that while cameras are ubiquitous in the facility, he did not believe that the interior of inmates' cells were within their range. Young said union officials had long been raising concerns regarding staffing, as the Trump administration had imposed a hiring freeze and budget cuts on the Federal Bureau of Prisons (BOP), adding "All this was caused by the administration."

President Serene Gregg, of the American Federation of Government Employees Local 3148, said MCC is functioning with fewer than 70 percent of the needed correctional officers, forcing many to work mandatory overtime and 60 to 70-hour workweeks. In previous congressional testimony, Attorney General Barr admitted the BOP was "short" about 4,000 to 5,000 employees. He had lifted the freeze and was working to recruit sufficient new officers to replace those who had departed.

Epstein's attorneys asked Judge Berman to probe their client's death, alleging they could provide evidence that the incident resulting in his death was "far more consistent with assault" than suicide.

One week after having signed his final will, it had been reported that at least one camera in the hallway outside Epstein's cell had footage that was unusable, although other usable footage was recorded in the area. Two cameras that malfunctioned in front of Epstein's cell were sent to an FBI crime lab for examination. Federal prosecutors subpoenaed up to 20 correctional officers concerning the cause of Epstein's death.

On November 19, 2019, federal prosecutors in New York charged Metropolitan Correctional Center guards Michael Thomas and Tova Noel with creating false records, and with conspiracy, after video footage obtained by prosecutors revealed that Epstein had, against regulation, been in his cell unchecked for eight hours prior to being found dead.

On May 22, 2021, the two guards admitted they falsified records but were spared from any time behind bars under a deal with federal prosecutors. As part of a deferred prosecution agreement, on May 25, both officers pleaded guilty to falsifying records and conspiracy to defraud the United States. They were sentenced to six months supervisory release and will be required to perform 100 hours of community service.

In popular culture

Epstein's death became the subject of widespread controversy and debate, with the belief that his death was a homicide becoming a popular meme. HBO is creating a limited series on Epstein's life and death to be directed and executive produced by Adam McKay. Sony Pictures Television is additionally developing miniseries based on Epstein's life. In the season four finale of the CBS series The Good Fight, the plot revolves around Epstein's death. The Netflix documentary series Jeffrey Epstein: Filthy Rich premiered in May 2020. The Lifetime documentary Surviving Jeffrey Epstein premiered in August 2020.

On July 1, 2020, a statue of Epstein appeared in Albuquerque, New Mexico.

Footage of Trump and Epstein talking at the 1992 Mar-a-Lago party appears in the 2020 comedy mockumentary Borat Subsequent Moviefilm, where the footage is shown inspiring Borat to gift his teen daughter to someone in Trump's inner circle (with Borat deciding on Mike Pence, and later Rudy Giuliani). Later in the film, one of Borat's children also changes his name to Jeffrey Epstein.

Notes and references

Notes

References

Further reading

External links 

 Jeffrey Epstein's Little Black Book (Epstein's first discovered redacted contact book)
 Jeffery Epstein's Other Black Book (Epstein's second discovered redacted contact book)
 Jeffery Epstein Flight Logs
 2007 Non-prosecution agreement
 State of Florida vs. Jeffrey E. Epstein (Criminal Information, 2008)
 
 Collected news at the New York Daily News
 FBI records
 Epstein Indictment

 
1953 births
2019 deaths
2019 suicides
21st-century American criminals
American male criminals
American businesspeople convicted of crimes
American eugenicists
American financiers
American people convicted of child sexual abuse
American people who died in prison custody
American political fundraisers
American transhumanists
Articles containing video clips
Bear Stearns people
Bill Clinton controversies
Businesspeople from Florida
Businesspeople from New York City
Courant Institute of Mathematical Sciences alumni
Criminals from New York City
Donald Trump controversies
Harvard University people
Jewish American philanthropists
Lafayette High School (New York City) alumni
New York (state) Democrats
People charged with sex trafficking
People named in the Paradise Papers
People from Palm Beach, Florida
People from Sea Gate, Brooklyn
People who committed suicide in prison custody
Philanthropists from New York (state)
Prince Andrew, Duke of York
Prisoners and detainees of Florida
Prisoners who died in United States federal government detention
Suicides by hanging in New York City
Trump administration controversies